Życzyn  is a village in the administrative district of Gmina Trojanów, within Garwolin County, Masovian Voivodeship, in east-central Poland.

Population 
The village of Życzyn has a population of around 800 residents around 2018

References

Villages in Garwolin County